The 2006–07 season of the Norwegian Premier League, the highest bandy league for men in Norway.

21 games were played, with 2 points given for wins and 1 for draws. Stabæk won the league, whereas Høvik was relegated.

League table

References
Table

Seasons in Norwegian bandy
2006 in bandy
2007 in bandy
Band
Band